The Paleogene (also spelled Palaeogene or Palæogene; informally Lower Tertiary or Early Tertiary) is a geologic period and system that spans 43 million years from the end of the Cretaceous Period  million years ago (Mya) to the beginning of the Neogene Period  Mya. It is the beginning of the Cenozoic Era of the present Phanerozoic Eon. The earlier term Tertiary Period was used to define the span of time now covered by the Paleogene Period and subsequent Neogene Period; despite no longer being recognized as a formal stratigraphic term, 'Tertiary' still sometimes remains in informal use. Paleogene is often abbreviated "Pg" (but the United States Geological Survey uses the abbreviation  for the Paleogene on the Survey's geologic maps). 

During the Paleogene, mammals diversified from relatively small, simple forms into a large group of diverse animals in the wake of the Cretaceous–Paleogene extinction event that ended the preceding Cretaceous Period. 

This period consists of the Paleocene, Eocene, and Oligocene epochs. The end of the Paleocene (56 Mya) was marked by the Paleocene–Eocene Thermal Maximum, one of the most significant periods of global change during the Cenozoic, which upset oceanic and atmospheric circulation and led to the extinction of numerous deep-sea benthic foraminifera and on land, a major turnover in mammals. The term 'Paleogene System' is applied to the rocks deposited during the 'Paleogene Period'.

Climate and geography
The global climate during the Paleogene departed from the hot and humid conditions of the late Mesozoic Era and began a cooling and drying trend. Though periodically disrupted by warm periods, such as the Latest Danian Event, Paleocene–Eocene Thermal Maximum, and Eocene Thermal Maximum 2, this trend persisted until the end of the most recent glacial period of the current ice age, when temperatures began to rise again. The trend was partly caused by the formation of the Antarctic Circumpolar Current, which significantly lowered oceanic water temperatures. A 2018 study estimated that during the early Palaeogene about 56-48 million years ago, annual air temperatures, over land and at mid-latitude, averaged about 23–29 °C (± 4.7 °C), which is 5–10 °C higher than most previous estimates.  For comparison, this was 10 to 15 °C higher than the current annual mean temperatures in these areas. The authors suggest that the current atmospheric carbon dioxide trajectory, if it continues, could establish these temperatures again.

During the Paleogene, the continents continued to drift closer to their current positions. India was in the process of colliding with Asia, forming the Himalayas. The Atlantic Ocean continued to widen by a few centimeters each year. Africa was moving north to collide with Europe and form the Mediterranean Sea, while South America was moving closer to North America (they would later connect via the Isthmus of Panama). Inland seas retreated from North America early in the period. Australia had also separated from Antarctica and was drifting toward Southeast Asia. The 1.2 Myr cycle of obliquity amplitude modulation governed eustatic sea level changes on shorter timescales, with periods of low amplitude coinciding with intervals of low sea levels and vice versa.

Flora and fauna
Tropical taxa diversified faster than those at higher latitudes following the Cretaceous–Paleogene extinction event, leading to the development of a significant latitudinal diversity gradient. Mammals began a rapid diversification during this period. After the Cretaceous–Paleogene extinction event, which saw the demise of the non-avian dinosaurs, mammals began to evolve from a few small and generalized forms into most of the modern varieties we see today. Some of these mammals evolved into large forms that dominated the land, while others became capable of living in marine, specialized terrestrial, and airborne environments. Those that took to the oceans became modern cetaceans, while those that took to the trees became primates, the group to which humans belong. Birds, extant dinosaurs which were already well established by the end of the Cretaceous, also experienced adaptive radiation as they took over the skies left empty by the now extinct pterosaurs. Some flightless birds such as penguins, ratites, and terror birds also filled niches left by the extinct hesperornithes and dinosaurs.

Pronounced cooling in the Oligocene led to a massive floral shift, and many extant modern plants arose during this time. Grasses and herbs, such as Artemisia, began to proliferate, at the expense of tropical plants, which began to decline.  Conifer forests developed in mountainous areas. This cooling trend continued, with major fluctuation, until the end of the Pleistocene. This evidence for this floral shift is found in the palynological record.

See also

References

External links

Paleogene Microfossils: 180+ images of Foraminifera
Paleogene (chronostratigraphy scale)

 
Geological periods